Alessio Puccio (born 1 June 1986) is an Italian voice actor.

Biography
Puccio often contributes to voicing characters in cartoons, anime, movies, and other content. He is well known for providing the voice of the protagonist Harry Potter in the Italian-language version of the Harry Potter film series. He also provides the voice of the secondary character Jeremy Johnson in the Italian-language version of the Disney Channel animated series Phineas and Ferb. He is also the current voice of Gumball Watterson in the Italian-language version of The Amazing World of Gumball.

He works at Pumaisdue, Sefit - CDC and other dubbing studios in Italy.

Dubbing roles

Animation
 Jeremy Johnson in Phineas and Ferb
 Jeremy-2 in Phineas and Ferb the Movie: Across the 2nd Dimension
 Sota Higurashi in InuYasha
 ApeTrully in Hero: 108
 Sho Yamato in Idaten Jump
 Ryan in The Wild
 Doowee McAdam  in Sally Bollywood: Super Detective
 Pierre in The Wonderful World of Puss 'n Boots (2004 dub)
 Tina Belcher in Bob's Burgers
 Gumball Watterson in The Amazing World of Gumball
 Rivalz Cardemonde in Code Geass: Lelouch of the Rebellion
 Jacobo Jacobo in The Replacements
 Zephyr in The Hunchback of Notre Dame II
 Kicker in Transformers: Energon
 Roger Radcliffe in The Life and Times of Juniper Lee
 Pongdybory in Noonbory and the Super Seven
 Jordan Greenway in Inazuma Eleven
 Bald Man in ChalkZone

Live action
 Harry Potter in Harry Potter and the Philosopher's Stone
 Harry Potter in Harry Potter and the Chamber of Secrets
 Harry Potter in Harry Potter and the Prisoner of Azkaban
 Harry Potter in Harry Potter and the Goblet of Fire
 Harry Potter in Harry Potter and the Order of the Phoenix
 Harry Potter in Harry Potter and the Half-Blood Prince
 Harry Potter in Harry Potter and the Deathly Hallows – Part 1
 Harry Potter in Harry Potter and the Deathly Hallows – Part 2
 Peter Pan in Peter Pan
 Oliver Oken in Hannah Montana
 Cisco Ramon in The Flash
 Blane Whittaker in M.I. High
 Dale Turner in Jericho (2006 TV series)
 Alan King in Jake & Blake
 George Zinavoy in The Art of Getting By
 Bobby Carter in The Hills Have Eyes (2006 film)
 George Little in Stuart Little
 Anakin Skywalker in Star Wars: Episode I – The Phantom Menace
 Jeremy Gilbert in The Vampire Diaries
 Benjy Fleming in Monk (TV series)
 Eric van der Woodsen in Gossip Girl
 Clyde in Mean Creek
 Martin in Let the Right One In
 Rory Joseph Hennessy in 8 Simple Rules
 Michael Richard Kyle, Jr. in My Wife and Kids
 Mark in The Suite Life of Zack & Cody
 Thom in Nick and Norah's Infinite Playlist
 Mowgli in Mowgli: The New Adventures of the Jungle Book
 Calvin in I Dream
 Teddy in The Hangover Part II
 Wilder Guiliver Atticus Wilder in The Latest Buzz
 Mark Woods in Daddio
 David in A.I. Artificial Intelligence
 Forrest Gump, Jr. in Forrest Gump
 Ron Stieger in Ein Fall für B.A.R.Z.
 Co-King Brady King of Kinkow in Pair of Kings
 Artie Abrams in Glee
 Paul in Boogeyman 2
 Pietros in Spartacus: Blood and Sand
 Milo in Delivering Milo
 Dylan in Modern Family
 Pete Walker in My Parents Are Aliens
 Parker Chase in Quintuplets
 Eric McGorrill in Flight 29 Down
 Allen in The Journey of Allen Strange
 Rupert Patterson in Super Rupert
 Theodore in Alvin and the Chipmunks
 Theodore in Alvin and the Chipmunks: The Squeakquel
 Theodore in Alvin and the Chipmunks: Chipwrecked
 Jaskier in The Witcher (TV series)

References

External links
 
 

Living people
Male actors from Rome
Italian male voice actors
1986 births